"Tuvalu for the Almighty" is the national anthem of Tuvalu. The lyrics and music are by Afaese Manoa. It was adopted in 1978, when the country became independent from the United Kingdom.

Lyrics

See also
 Afaese Manoa

Notes

References

External links
 National anthem of Tuvalu MIDI
 National Anthem of Tuvalu - Streaming audio, lyrics and information (archive link)

National anthems
Tuvaluan music
National symbols of Tuvalu
Oceanian anthems
National anthem compositions in B-flat major
1978 establishments in Tuvalu